Aulosphaera is a genus of Cercozoa. The genus contains bioluminescent species. It one of two known bioluminescent phaeodarean genera (formerly thought to be radiolarians), the other being Tuscaridium. The described bioluminescent species is Aulosphaera triodon Haeckel, 1887.

Species
The following species are known (incomplete list):
Aulosphaera elegantissima Haeckel
Aulosphaera trigonopa Haeckel, 1860
Aulosphaera bisternaria Haeckel
Aulosphaera filigera Haecker, 1908
Aulosphaera labradoriensis Borgert
Aulosphaera robusta Haecker, 1908
Aulosphaera triodon Haeckel, 1887
Aulosphaera trispathis Haecker, 1908
Aulosphaera verticillata Haeckel

References

Phaeodaria
Cercozoa genera
Bioluminescent phaeodarians
Taxa named by Ernst Haeckel